The 2011–12 Youngstown State Penguins men's basketball team represents Youngstown State University in the 2011–12 NCAA Division I men's basketball season. Their head coach is Jerry Slocum. The Penguins play their home games at the Beeghly Center and are members of the Horizon League.

Roster

Schedule

|-
!colspan=9| Regular season

|-
!colspan=9| Horizon League tournament

References

Youngstown State Penguins
Youngstown State Penguins men's basketball seasons
2011 in sports in Ohio
2012 in sports in Ohio